The  2008 AFF Women's Championship was held from 8 October to 20 October 2008, hosted by Vietnam. All games were played at the Thanh Long Sports Centre in Ho Chi Minh City. The hosts managed to get through to the final, but failed to win the title after losing 0–1 to Australia, who made their debut in the tournament since Football Australia transferred to the Asian Football Confederation in 2006 and were assigned to the ASEAN Football Federation.

Group stage

Group A

Group B

Knockout stage

Semi-finals

Third place match

Final

Awards 
.

Statistics

Final ranking

External links 
 AFF Women's Championship 2008 at AFF official website

Women's
AFF Women's
2008
2008